Lovely Ladies, Kind Gentlemen is a musical with a book by John Patrick and music and lyrics by Stan Freeman and Franklin Underwood.

Overview
The musical is based on Patrick's 1953 play and screenplay The Teahouse of the August Moon. It focuses on Capt. Fisby who, assigned to Americanize the village of Tobiki on Okinawa following World War II, encourages the residents to build a school. They would prefer a traditional teahouse instead, and when Fisby discovers the potent alcoholic beverage they brew is popular with the American GIs and a big money-maker, he falls in with their plans. Helping him become assimilated to the local mores are local interpreter Sakini and geisha Lotus Blossom.

Production
The musical opened in Philadelphia, Pennsylvania at the Shubert Theatre on August 19, 1970 in its out of town tryout and then had tryout performances in Los Angeles (Civic Light Opera) and San Francisco. The latter production's opening night performance was greeted by roughly 250 to 300 picketers—some carrying signs reading, "Sakini Dyed for Our Sins"—whose spokesperson stated:
Asians should be given the right to audition ... and to refuse to take such roles in a racist play. 

The musical premiered on Broadway at the Majestic Theatre on December 28, 1970 and closed on January 9, 1971 after 19 performances and three previews. Directed by Lawrence Kasha and choreographed by Marc Breaux, the cast included Kenneth Nelson as Sakini, David Burns as Colonel Wainwright Purdy III, Ron Husmann as Capt. Fisby, and Eleanor Calbes as Lotus Blossom.

Burns was nominated for the Tony Award for Best Actor in a Musical, and Freddy Wittop was nominated for Best Costume Design.

Song list

Act I      
 With a Snap of My Finger
 Right Hand Man
 Find Your Own Cricket
 One Side of the World
 Geisha
 You Say-They Say
 This Time
 Simple Word
 Garden Guaracha
 It's Good Enough for Lady Astor

Act II      
Chaya
Call Me Back
Lovely Ladies, Kind Gentlemen
You've Broken a Fine Woman's Heart
One More for the Last One

Critical response
Critic Clive Barnes, in his review for The New York Times wrote: "Oh, dear! I come to bury Lovely Ladies, Kind Gentle man, [sic] not to praise it, but there were one or two decent things, and three or four half decent things, about this strangely dated musical that modestly opened last night at the Majestic Theater."

Douglas Watt, reviewing for the News, wrote "It is lively, colorful and generally engaging entertainment. The songs... are tuneful."

The group Oriental Actors of America picketed the Majestic Theatre on opening night because of the production's use of "yellowface."

Awards and honors

Original Broadway production

References

Further reading

External links
 
 Photos from NYPL Digital Collections
 
 

1970 musicals
Broadway musicals
Japan in fiction
Japan in non-Japanese culture
Musicals based on films
Musicals based on plays